Advising Platform Lightning or more simply AP Lightning was an installation used by Task Force Southeast to train 203rd Corps of the Afghan National Army and the 303rd Afghanistan National Police Zone Headquarters. It was formerly named Forward Operating Base (FOB) Lightning, an American military base in Paktia Province, Afghanistan. It was closed in March 2020.

Deployed units;

 4th Brigade Combat Team “Highlanders”, 1st Armored Division ( - April 2013)

References 

Installations of the United States Army in Afghanistan